This was the first edition of the tournament.

Romain Arneodo and Andrei Vasilevski won the title after defeating Robert Galloway and Nathaniel Lammons 6–4, 7–6(7–4) in the final.

Seeds

Draw

References
 Main draw

Cleveland Open - Doubles
Cleveland Open